Bedford Orthopedic Hospital is a Provincial government funded Orthopedic hospital in Mthatha, Eastern Cape in South Africa.

The hospital departments include Out Patients Department, Surgical Services, Operating Theatre & CSSD Services, Pharmacy, Physiotherapy, Radiology, Occupational Services, Laundry Services, and Kitchen Services.

References

Bedford Orthopaedic Hospital website

Hospitals in the Eastern Cape
King Sabata Dalindyebo Local Municipality